Magi-Nation is an animated series based on the card game Magi-Nation Duel. The series was co-produced by Cookie Jar Entertainment, in association with The Canadian Broadcasting Corporation. The series premiered in Canada on September 8, 2007, on CBC and on September 22, 2007 in the U.S. on Kids' WB. A series of DVDs was set to be released from October 21, 2008 through January 6, 2009 from NCircle Entertainment. The series had formerly aired in the U.S. on Toonzai on The CW and formerly on Cookie Jar Toons on This TV, with the second season's worldwide premiere airing on Cookie Jar Toons. The series was cancelled due to low ratings of the second season. The twelve remaining episodes have been released online.

Synopsis
Three thousand years ago in the Moonlands, the Shadow Magi Agram was sealed inside the planet's Core by the Core Glyph and the Dreamstones which provided its power. Now he plans to escape by using his Shadow Geysers to weaken his prison in order to bring the Moonlands under his control, and only a Magi known as the "Final Dreamer" can stop him. A young boy from Earth, Tony Jones, is summoned into the Moonlands as he is believed to be this Final Dreamer. He joins forces with the apprentice Magi, Edyn, and the Shadow Stalker, Strag, on a mission to gather the Dreamstones before Agram is set free. Using the Book of Elders, the three travel through the Moonlands while combatting the forces of Agram and gaining an ever-growing collection of Dream Creatures from the Moonlands that they visit.

Voice cast (credited order)

 Lyon Smith - Tony Jones
 Martha MacIsaac - Edyn, Bisiwog
 Dan Petronijevic - Strag
 Rick Miller - Freep, Orwin, Ashio
 Joseph Motiki - Ugger
 Alan Park - Furok
 Martin Roach - Agram
 Alex Karzis - Korg, Naroom Hyren
 Rory O'Shea - Zed, Djarmander

Minor cast

 Jason Barr
 Emily Hurson
 Alan Park
 Julie Lemieux
 Bill Colgate
 Jamie Watson
 Rory O'Shea
 Jason Deline
 Dan Petronijevic
 Scott McCord
 Rick Miller
 Linda Ballantyne
 Helen King
 Joris Jarsky
 Dwayne Hill
 Barbara Budd

Cast and characters

Main
 Lyon Smith as Anthony "Tony" Jones, a 14-year-old boy from Earth who was summoned to the Moonlands with a ring given to him by his grandfather, Spencer Jones. He has dark brown hair, a fur vest and heavy-duty boots as well as developing a muscular chest and arms from his time in the Moonlands. Although initially unwilling to take on his role as a hero, Tony comes to accept the realm as his new home and his friends as a family. After months of training, he becomes a skilled warrior who adjusts to his new world's culture and lifestyle. He also has a crush on Trup'tika, a girl of his age from the ocean realm of Orothe. His main Dream Creature is Furok (voiced by Alan Park), a mysterious bearlike creature who is his best friend and protector.
 Martha MacIsaac as Edyn, a 14-year-old beautiful girl from the forests of Naroom who lives with her guardian, Orwin. She's Tony's other best friend, always there to have his back, is well-read in the books of the Moonlands, caring, organized, brave, and is an expert magic spell caster. She has very long red hair tied up in a ponytail, an athletic, slender figure topped off with a leaf skirt and red short-sleeved shirt. Her main Dream Creature is Ugger (voiced by Joseph Motiki), a plant-based creature with a rhinoceros-like horn.
 Dan Petronijevic as Strag, a 14-year-old from the Underneath who has trained as a Shadow Stalker to rid the Moonlands of the Shadow Magi. He is one of the Final Dreamers alongside Tony and Edyn, and is able to use his Moon senses to aid them in their adventures. Despite this training, he is of the lineage of the first Shadow Magi, Agram, and lives with this shadow. Strag primarily uses relics and his turtlelike Dream Creature, Freep (voiced by Rick Miller).
 Martin Roach as Agram, the powerful leader of the Shadow Magi who was sealed in the Core of the Moonlands 3,000 years ago. He uses his Shadow Geysers to weaken his prison in an attempt to return to the surface Moonlands. During the first season, he escaped from the Core but was re-imprisoned with the Book of Elders. In the second season, he returned using the body of Gorath, one of his Dream Creatures.
 Alex Karzis and Rory O'Shea as Korg and Zed, Agram's primary henchmen. They're a duo of evil, yet bumbling Shadow Magi who use an arsenal of evil Dream Creatures supplied by Agram. They later are joined by other Shadow Magi including Chur, Ashio, and Warrada.

Recurring
 Rick Miller as Orwin, the Elder of Vash Naroom and Edyn's guardian. He is a powerful Magi and a mentor to Tony, Edyn, and Strag. Though Orwin was later turned into a Shadow Magi by Korg and Zed in "Fiery Betrayal," he was soon returned to normal in "The Secret Chamber."
 Julie Lemieux as Evu, a wise old woman from Vash Naroom. She helped to summon Tony to the Moonlands and often assisted Tony, Edyn, and Strag on their adventures. She is a wise sage and displays great power despite her age and her size.
 Rick Miller as Ashio, a Shadow Magi who was sent to destroy the Moonland of Paradwyn.
 Helen King as Trup'tika, a teenage mermaid girl from the realm of Orothe. She has long red-pink hair tied in two buns, pointed ears, gills, and can transform her legs into a tail to enable her to swim with ummatched grace and agility. Trup'tika has a noticeable crush on Tony, which Strag and Edyn often tease him about. She admires Tony for his selflessness and bravery in his quest to save the Moonlands from destruction.

Dream Creatures
Dream Creatures are creatures that inhabit the Moonlands and originate from the Dream Plane. A Magi who gains the trust of a Dream Creature or defeats it in battle gains an Animite crystal. This Animite can be used to summon that Dream Creature back from the Dream Plane when needed by using some of a Magi's energy. A Dream Creature that is defeated simply returns to the Dream Plane and can be summoned again if the Magi has sufficient energy. Within the Dream Plane, even corrupted Core Creatures are temporarily purified to their natural states.

Guardian Hyrens 
The Guardian Hyrens are unique Dream Creatures and a subset of the often draconic Hyrens. Each Guardian Hyren protects a particular Moonland and, namely, its respective Dreamstone. A test is given to those seeking a Guardian Hyren's Dreamstone in order to test that Magi's worthiness and character.

Episodes

Season 1

Season 2

Merchandising
Cookie Jar Entertainment acquired merchandising rights along with the TV show license. An online computer game, Magi-Nation: Battle for the Moonlands, has been released. It was distributed by Acclaim Games. A new card game and a Nintendo DS video game adaptation were announced but ultimately did not see a release.

Telecast and home media
The series was first premiered in Canada on September 8, 2007, on CBC and on September 22, 2007 in the U.S. on Kids' WB. The series had formerly aired in the U.S. on Toonzai on The CW and formerly on Cookie Jar Toons on This TV, with the second season's worldwide premiere airing on Cookie Jar Toons. The show was cancelled due to low ratings of the second season.

DVD releases
A series of DVDs was set to be released from October 21, 2008 through January 6, 2009 from NCircle Entertainment.

Magi-Nation: The Moonlands, released on June 16, 2009, includes these episodes: "The Final Dreamer, Fire and Ice, Blight, Enemy in the Sands".
Magi-Nation: Fight the Shadows, released on June 16, 2009, includes these episodes: "First Geyser, Cloud Cover, Fiery Betrayal, Eyes of Agram".

In the United Kingdom, Platform Entertainment Ltd released episodes on DVD.

In Germany, season 1 was released on five DVDs; all contained both German and English-language audio tracks.

Online streaming
The series' twelve remaining episodes have been released online. Currently, the entire series is now streaming on Tubi.

References

External links
 Official Website
  at DHX Media
 

2000s Canadian animated television series
2010s Canadian animated television series
2007 Canadian television series debuts
2010 Canadian television series endings
2010s South Korean television series
2007 South Korean television series debuts
2010 South Korean television series endings
Canadian children's animated action television series
Canadian children's animated adventure television series
Canadian children's animated fantasy television series
South Korean children's animated action television series
South Korean children's animated adventure television series
South Korean children's animated fantasy television series
Anime-influenced Western animated television series
Kids' WB original shows
CW4Kids original programming
CBC Television original programming
Television series by Cookie Jar Entertainment
English-language television shows
Teen animated television series